The Trudeau Landing Site (16 WF 25), also known as  Tunica Village and Trudeau, is an archaeological site in Tunica, unincorporated West Feliciana Parish, Louisiana, United States. It was once occupied by the Tunica tribe. Later it was developed by Europeans as the Trudeau Plantation.

Tunica treasure
In the 1960s, graves at the site were dug up by a local self-described treasure hunter, who worked as a guard at Louisiana State Prison (Angola). He took many artifacts from the area, which had been deposited as grave goods with the more than 100 graves. The Tunica felt that he had stolen tribal heirlooms and desecrated the graves of their ancestors and were outraged at the violations. He tried to sell the artifacts to the Peabody Museum at Harvard University, but the transaction stalled when the museum found that he did not have legal title to the items.

In the 1970s, the site was excavated by archaeologists, who uncovered large amounts of pottery, European trade goods, and other artifacts deposited as grave goods by the Tunica from 1731 to 1764 when they were in residence. With help from the State of Louisiana, the tribe filed a lawsuit to obtain the title to the artifacts.

A decade passed in the courts, but the ruling became a landmark in Native American history, and it helped lay the groundwork for new Federal legislation, the Native American Graves Protection and Repatriation Act, passed in 1990. It was also used to prove the ancient heritage of the Tunica peoples, and helped them to gain state and Federal recognition.

A museum to house the artifacts was built by the Tunica-Biloxi, in Marksville, Louisiana. They are using it also as a conservation and education center for preservation of their artifacts.

References

External links

Indian Mounds Louisiana

Archaeological sites in Louisiana
Art and cultural repatriation
Geography of West Feliciana Parish, Louisiana
Archaeological theft
Archaeological sites on the National Register of Historic Places in Louisiana
National Register of Historic Places in West Feliciana Parish, Louisiana
Native American history of Louisiana